The North Central Conference is an IHSAA-sanctioned athletic conference consisting of ten large high schools in Cass, Delaware, Grant, Howard, Madison, Marion, Tippecanoe, and Wayne Counties across Central and North Central Indiana. Most of these schools are in 35,000+ population towns like Anderson, Marion, Kokomo, Lafayette, Muncie, and Richmond. Several of the nation's largest gymnasiums belong to members of this conference.

History
The Conference was formed on March 23, 1926 by 10 schools in the Central third of Indiana. Charter members were Anderson, Arsenal Tech of Indianapolis, Frankfort, Kokomo, Lebanon, Logansport, Muncie Central, New Castle, Richmond, and Rochester. With a couple of minor changes in the first decade (Lafayette Jeff replacing Rochester in 1930, and Marion replacing Lebanon in 1933), the conference membership remained unchanged, while the conference added more sports to its umbrella.

This changed in 1960, as Arsenal Tech was forced to join the IPS Conference, and Frankfort left to co-found the Sagamore Conference in 1967. The conference would continue on with the same eight members for the next 36 years while changes were happening in the communities outside the schools. Anderson, Kokomo, and Muncie would open up second and third city high schools, while consolidations in the rural areas outside of Lafayette would give Jeff two similar-sized local rivals. However, the economic crisis and industrial decline in the late 1970s and early 1980s hit many of these cities hard, as populations dwindled without anything replacing the lost manufacturing jobs. Anderson, Kokomo, and Muncie are now down to one high school each.

In the face of these population shifts, Lafayette Jeff joined the Hoosier Crossroads Conference in 2003, joining local rivals Harrison and McCutcheon, as well as the growing suburban schools outside of Indianapolis. Huntington North was brought in from the Olympic Conference as a replacement, where it had previously had conference rivals located in Muncie and Anderson.

New Castle elected to leave the NCC at the beginning of the 2013-2014 school year. They joined the Hoosier Heritage Conference in 2014. Huntington North left the NCC at the conclusion of the 2014-15 season to become a member of the Northeast Hoosier Conference. Lafayette Jeff rejoined the conference in 2014, bringing along fellow county schools Harrison and McCutcheon. Indianapolis Arsenal Tech rejoined the NCC as of April 1, 2015, but due to travel concerns, it will exit the conference at the end of the 2022-23 school year.

Membership

 Arsenal played in the IPS Conference 1960-2015.
 Lafayette Jeff played in the HCC 2003-14.
 Known as Muncie until 1963.
 Known as Morton until 1948.

Former Members

Membership timeline

Divisions
Starting with the 2014 season, the NCC began divisional competition.  This only applies in boys and girls soccer, boys and girls tennis, boys baseball, and girls softball.

Conference Championships

Football

Boys Basketball

Girls Basketball

Boys Cross Country

State Championships

Anderson (26)
 1935 Boys Basketball
 1937 Boys Basketball
 1945 Boys Track & Field
 1946 Boys Basketball
 1946 Boys Track & Field
 1946 Boys Cross Country
 1947 Boys Track & Field
 1947 Boys Cross Country
 1948 Boys Track & Field
 1948 Boys Cross Country
 1949 Boys Cross Country
 1950 Boys Cross Country
 1951 Boys Cross Country
 1952 Boys Golf
 1952 Boys Cross Country
 1953 Boys Golf
 1955 Boys Golf
 1955 Boys Cross Country
 1959 Boys Cross Country
 1972 Boys Golf
 1974 Boys Golf
 1984 Girls Swimming & Diving
 1985 Girls Swimming & Diving
 1988 Boys Swimming & Diving
 1989 Boys Swimming & Diving
 1995 Boys Golf

Arsenal Tech (10)
 1918 Baseball
 1922 Boys Track
 1933 Boys Golf
 1936 Boys Golf
 1947 Boys Golf
 1948 Boys Golf
 1952 Wrestling
 1976 Wrestling
 1979 Wrestling
 2014 Boys Basketball (4A)

Harrison (4)
 1974 Girls Track
 1992 Football (4A)
 1995 Baseball
 2017 Boys Soccer (3A)

Huntington North (2)
 1990 Girls Basketball
 1995 Girls Basketball

Kokomo (19)
 1911 Boys Track
 1924 Boys Track
 1925 Boys Track
 1926 Boys Track
 1927 Boys Track
 1934 Boys Track
 1935 Boys Track
 1937 Boys Track
 1958 Boys Golf
 1961 Boys Basketball
 1969 Boys Swimming
 1985 Baseball
 1985 Boys Golf
 1986 Boys Golf
 1988 Boys Golf
 1992 Girls Basketball
 1993 Girls Basketball
 1994 Boys Track
 2003 Girls Basketball (4A)

Lafayette Jefferson Bronchos (14)
 1916 boys' Basketball
 1932 boys' Golf
 1948 boys' Basketball
 1964 boys' Basketball
 1969 Baseball
 1973 Baseball
 1974 girls' Swimming
 1975 boys' Tennis
 1977 boys' Golf
 1978 boys' Golf
 1979 girls' Golf
 1983 girls' Golf
 1984 girls' Golf
 1987 boys' Golf

Logansport (5)
 1934 Boys Basketball
 1975 Baseball
 1977 Baseball
 1979 Baseball
 1991 Baseball

Marion (11)
 1926 Boys Basketball
 1966 Boys Golf
 1975 Boys Basketball
 1976 Boys Basketball
 1984 Baseball
 1985 Boys Basketball
 1986 Boys Basketball
 1987 Boys Basketball
 1991 Boys Tennis
 2000 Boys Basketball (4A)
 2016 Boys Basketball (3A)

McCutcheon (4)
 1999 Baseball (4A)
 2003 Baseball (4A)
 2008 Softball (4A)
 2021 Girls' Volleyball (4A)

Muncie Central (17)
 1928 Boys Basketball
 1931 Boys Basketball
 1951 Boys Basketball
 1952 Boys Basketball
 1963 Boys Basketball
 1978 Boys Basketball
 1979 Boys Basketball
 1988 Boys Basketball
 1956 Boys Cross Country
 1958 Boys Cross Country
 1967 Boys Cross Country
 1997 Volleyball (4A)
 1998 Volleyball (4A)
 1999 Volleyball (4A)
 2002 Volleyball (4A)
 2004 Volleyball (4A)
 2009 Volleyball (4A)

Richmond (8)
 1941 Boys Golf
 1958 Wrestling
 1992 Boys Basketball
 1993 Boys Golf
 1994 Boys Cross Country
 1996 Boys Golf
 1997 Boys Golf
 2003 Boys Golf

Largest gymnasiums in nation in NCC 
1. Anderson High School Wigwam (8,996) NOT IN USE.
4. Richmond Tiernan Center (8,100)
6. Marion High School (7,560)

Neighboring conferences 
Mid-Indiana Conference (MIC)
Central Indiana Athletic Conference
Three Rivers Conference

See also 
 Hoosier Hysteria
 Largest high school gyms in the United States

External links

Resources 

 IHSAA Conferences
 IHSAA Directory

Indiana high school athletic conferences
High school sports conferences and leagues in the United States
1926 establishments in Indiana